Dos Hermanas Club de Fútbol was a Spanish football team based in Dos Hermanas, in the autonomous community of Andalusia. Founded in 1971 and dissolved in 2014, it last played in Regional Preferente de Sevilla, holding home games at Estadio Miguel Román García, with a capacity of 3,200 seats.

History

Originally known as Dos Hermanas CF, the club was dissolved in 2014. After that, two distinct successor teams were created. In 2014, Atlético Dos Hermanas CF, and in 2021, Dos Hermanas CF 1971. Both of them are currently competing on the Regional leagues.

Season to season

3 seasons in Segunda División B
15 seasons in Tercera División

Notable former players
 Alejandro Campano
 Sergio Castaño
 Diego
 Daniel Güiza

Notable former managers
 Lucas Alcaraz

External links
triunfa.es profile 
lapreferente.com profile 
Fútbol Regional Español profile 

Defunct football clubs in Andalusia
Association football clubs established in 1971
Association football clubs disestablished in 2014
1971 establishments in Spain
2014 disestablishments in Spain
Divisiones Regionales de Fútbol clubs
Province of Seville